The Life and Crimes of Alice Cooper (1999) is a 4-CD box set by Alice Cooper. It includes select tracks from every studio album released until then, plus many B-sides, unreleased songs, and other rarities. It also includes Alice Cooper's authorized biography, Alcohol and Razor Blades, Poison and Needles: The Glorious Wretched Excess of Alice Cooper, All-American, written by Creem magazine editor Jeffrey Morgan.

Track listing

References 

Alice Cooper compilation albums
1999 compilation albums
Rhino Records compilation albums